Mount Meridian is an unincorporated community in Augusta County, Virginia, United States. The Mt. Meridian Schoolhouse, which is listed on the National Register of Historic Places, is located near Mount Meridian.

Politician James A. Walker was a native of the Mount Meridian area.

References

Unincorporated communities in Augusta County, Virginia
Unincorporated communities in Virginia